The Innocent Years is a studio album by American country artist, Kathy Mattea. It was released on May 16, 2000 via Mercury Nashville and included 12 tracks of original material. It was the eleventh studio project of Mattea's career and her last with the Mercury Nashville label. The Innocent Years was a collection of songs that discussed Mattea's feelings associated with her father's failing health. Among its songs were the singles "The Trouble with Angels" and "BFD". The album received positive reviews from critics and made the American country albums chart.

Background
Kathy Mattea was among the country genre's most popular recording artists during the eighties and nineties. A total of four singles topped the American country songs chart ("Goin' Gone", "Eighteen Wheels and a Dozen Roses", "Come from the Heart" and "Burnin' Old Memories") while a dozen more made the top ten or top 20. By the end of the nineties, Mattea had taken time off to care for her aging parents. She also turned 40 years old and was beginning to reconsider her professional outlook. She chose to make an album that reflected her recent experiences. "I realized that I had a chance to make this album from a different place. I thought, Life is so deep right now. I don't want to make a shallow record," she told the Chicago Tribune. Mattea also wanted to dedicate the album to her father as his life was coming to an end. She chose the title of The Innocent Years to reflect "the time when most of us are sheltered, taken care of". The album's cover photo was a photo of Mattea at age two.

Recording and content
The Innocent Years was produced by Mattea herself, along with Ben Wisch. One track also featured production credits from Keith Stegall. The album consisted of 11 tracks, along with one bonus track. The second track, "The Trouble with Angels", described how God looks after people on Earth. The third track, "Why Can't We", reflected on people of Mattea's parents' generation and questioned what was learned from their lives. The ninth track, "That's the Deal", describes how a husband takes of her ailing wife who suffered a stroke. The album's bonus track, "BFD", describes a man who finds a new partner that provides him with the love and respect he needed. Finding that the song did not fit with the project's theme, Mattea chose to make it a "bonus track". Two recordings were co-written by Mattea herself: "Callin' My Name" (co-written with husband Jon Vezner) and the title track (also co-written with Vezner and Sally Barris).

Critical reception

The Innocent Years gained a positive reception from critics and writers. Maria Konicki Dinoia of AllMusic gave it three out of five stars. She named both the title track and "Trouble with Angels" as "track picks" in her review. She also noted the album's use of ballads and how the concept reflected the "tender mercies of life". Eli Messinger of Country Standard Time wrote that, "Though the smooth sound and heart-on-her-sleeve lyrics may not be for the country roots fan (nor the cynically-minded, for that matter), Mattea's superb voice and mature readings are clearly the work of an accomplished artist chasing her musical muse." Dave McKenna of The Washington Post commented, "Kathy Mattea provides a pretty comprehensive primer on the downside of contemporary country with her new CD, The Innocent Years.

Release, chart performance and singles
The Innocent Years was released on May 16, 2000 on Mercury Records Nashville. It was originally distributed as a compact disc and a cassette. It was Mattea's final album on the Mercury label before shifting towards independent record companies. It spent nine weeks on America's Billboard Top Country Albums chart, peaking at number 35 on June 3, 2000. In its first week, more than 4000 copies of the album were sold. Two singles were also spawned from the project. The first was the "Trouble with Angels", which was released by Mercury in April 2000. Spending eight weeks on the Billboard Hot Country Songs chart, it only peaked at number 53 in May 2000. "BFD" was then issued as the album's second single in June 2000. It spent only four weeks on the Billboard country songs chart, and peaked at number 63 in July 2000.

Track listing

Chart performance

Release history

References

2000 albums
Albums produced by Kathy Mattea
Kathy Mattea albums
Mercury Records albums